In the United States and Canada, a biscuit is a variety of baked bread with a firm, dry exterior and a soft, crumbly interior. It is made with baking powder as a leavening agent rather than yeast, and at times is called a baking powder biscuit to differentiate it from other types. Like other forms of bread, a biscuit is often served with butter or other condiments, flavored with other ingredients, or combined with other types of food to make sandwiches or other dishes.

Biscuits, soda breads, cornbread, and similar breads are all considered quick breads, meaning that they do not need time for the dough to rise before baking.

Biscuits developed from hardtack, which was first made from only flour and water, with later first lard and then baking powder being added.  The long development over time and place explains why the word biscuit can, depending upon the context and the speaker's English dialect, refer to very different baked goods.

History

Earlier history
American English and British English use the same word to refer to two distinctly different modern foods. Early hard biscuits (United States: cookies) were derived from a simple, storable version of bread. The word "biscuit" itself originates from the medieval Latin word , meaning "twice-cooked".

The modern Italian baked goods known as biscotti (also meaning "twice-cooked" in Italian) most closely resemble the Medieval Latin item and cooking technique.

The differences in the usage of biscuit in the English speaking world are remarked on by Elizabeth David in English Bread and Yeast Cookery. She writes, It is interesting that these soft biscuits are common to Guernsey, and that the term biscuit as applied to a soft product was retained in these places, and in America, whereas in England it has completely died out.

Early European settlers in the United States brought with them a simple, easy style of cooking, most often based on ground wheat and warmed with gravy. Most were not wealthy men and women, and so it was a source of cheap nutrition. A very similar practice was also popular once with the Royal Navy as hard, flour-based biscuits would keep for long journeys at sea but would also become so difficult to chew that they had to be softened up. These were first introduced in 1588 to the rations of ships and found their way into the New World by the 1700s at the latest.

The biscuit emerged as a distinct food type in the early 19th century, before the American Civil War. Cooks created a cheaply produced addition for their meals that required no yeast, which was expensive and difficult to store. With no leavening agents except the bitter-tasting pearlash available, beaten biscuits were laboriously beaten and folded to incorporate air into the dough which expanded when heated in the oven causing the biscuit to rise. In eating, the advantage of the biscuit over a slice of bread was that it was harder, and hence kept its shape when wiping up gravy in the popular combination biscuits and gravy.

In 1875, Alexander P. Ashbourne patented the first biscuit cutter in the United States, useful for making cookies, cakes, or baking powder biscuits. It consisted of a board to roll the biscuits out on, which was hinged to a metal plate with various biscuit cutter shapes mounted to it.

Later history

Southern chefs may have had an advantage in creating biscuits. Northern American all-purpose flours, mainly grown in Ohio, Indiana and Illinois, are made from the hard spring wheats that grow in the North's cold-winter climate. Southern American bleached all-purpose flours, originally grown in the Carolinas, Georgia and Tennessee before national food distribution networks, are made from the soft winter wheat that grows in the warm Southern summer. This summer growth results in wheat that has less protein, which is more suited to the creation of quick breads, as well as cookies, cakes and muffins.

Pre-shaped ready-to-bake biscuits can be purchased in supermarkets, in the form of small refrigerated cylindrical segments of dough encased in a cardboard can. These refrigerator biscuits were patented by Ballard and Ballard in 1931.

Preparing
A typical recipe will include baking powder or baking soda, flour, salt, shortening or butter, and milk or buttermilk. The percentages of these ingredients vary as historically the recipe would pass orally from family to family and generation to generation.  Biscuits are almost always a savory food item. Sugar is rare or included in only small quantities, and was not part of the traditional recipe.  

Biscuits can be prepared for baking in several ways. The dough can be rolled out flat and cut into rounds, which expand when baked into flaky-layered cylinders (rolled biscuits). If extra liquid is added, the dough's texture changes to resemble stiff pancake batter so that small spoonfuls can be dropped upon the baking sheet to produce drop biscuits, which are more amorphous in texture and shape.

Although most biscuits are made without yeast, a type of biscuit called an angel biscuit contains yeast as well, as do those made with a sourdough starter.

Serving 
Biscuits may be eaten for breakfast. They are meant to be served warm with a choice of spread of butter, honey, cane syrup, or some fruit-based jam; otherwise, they are cut in half and become the Southern version of the breakfast sandwich, in which any combination of Country ham, tomato, scrambled eggs, bacon, or sausage is put in the biscuits halves as a filling.

For dinner, they are a popular accompaniment to fried chicken, nearly all types of Southern barbecue, and several Lowcountry dishes. They also often figure in to the Southern version of Thanksgiving dinner as well.

Variations 

Large drop biscuits, because of their size and rough exterior texture, are sometimes referred to as cat head biscuits. 

Biscuits may be flavored with other ingredients. For example, the baker may add grated cheddar or American cheese to the basic recipe to produce cheese biscuits. Home cooks may use mass-produced, highly processed refrigerator biscuits for a quicker alternative to rolled or drop biscuits.

A sweet biscuit layered or topped with fruit (typically strawberries) and whipped cream is one type of shortcake.

See also
 Scone — a British leavened bread-like baked good that is similar to an American biscuit, except that scones are typically (though not exclusively) sweet (and served with sweet toppings like jam), while American biscuits are usually savory and served with savory meals
 Bizcocho — various different baked food items across the Latin world, resembling anything from breads, cakes, or cookies, depending on the country 
 Biskotso — a type of baked garlic bread from the Philippines

References

External links

American breads
Canadian cuisine
Christmas food
Cuisine of the Southern United States
Quick breads
Thanksgiving food